KDFG  is a non-commercial classical music radio station in Seaside, California, broadcasting to the Santa Cruz-Carmel-Salinas, California, area on 103.9 FM. Owned by the University of Southern California, the station broadcasts a classical music format as a full-time simulcast of KDFC in San Francisco.

History
The station's studio was originally in Monterey while its transmitter was located on  Mount Toro, south of Salinas. In 2002, alternative rock station KMBY-FM moved from 104.3 FM to 103.9 FM. Its format eventually evolved into a hybrid of modern rock, hard rock, alternative rock, and hip hop, and it was branded as X103.9.

On February 9, 2008, the classical music programming of KBOQ (branded as K-Bach) moved from 95.5 FM to 103.9 FM, displacing KMBY's programming. On February 14, 2008, the station temporarily changed its call sign to KKHK. It then swapped its call sign with 95.5 FM, gaining the KBOQ call sign, on February 26, 2008. On October 17, 2011, KBOQ changed its format from classical to soft adult contemporary without warning, branded as B103.9.

In May 2014, Mapleton Communications agreed to sell KBOQ to Saul Levine's Mount Wilson FM Broadcasters, Inc. for $200,000. Mapleton had to divest one station after buying KWAV from Buckley Broadcasting. That July, the website q1039thehits.com was registered, leading to reports of a format change to contemporary hit radio as Q103.9. On September 5, 2014, upon officially being bought by Mount Wilson FM, the station's branding did change to Q103.9 but flipped to classic hits instead of contemporary hits.

In June 2016, the University of Southern California purchased KBOQ for $475,000. The 103.9 frequency became part of USC's classical music radio network, while Mount Wilson FM Broadcasters retained the KBOQ call letters. The station changed its call letters to KDFG on August 26, 2016; on August 31, the station changed its format to back to classical, simulcasting the programming of KDFC.

Additional frequencies
In addition to KDFG, the programming of KDFC is transmitted by these stations and translators to widen its broadcast area.
 KDFC — 90.3 FM, licensed to San Francisco, California
 KXSC — 104.9 FM, licensed to Sunnyvale, California
 KOSC — 89.9 FM, licensed to Angwin, California
 K212AA — 90.3 FM, licensed to Los Gatos, California
 K223AJ — 92.5 FM, licensed to Lakeport, California

Previous logo

References

External links

DFG
Radio stations established in 1995
1995 establishments in California
University of Southern California
Classical music radio stations in the United States